Parahephaestion is a genus of beetles in the family Cerambycidae, containing the following species:

 Parahephaestion brasiliensis (Melzer, 1923)
 Parahephaestion malleri (Melzer, 1930)
 Parahephaestion zikani (Melzer, 1923)

References

Necydalinae